In Egyptian mythology, the name Mehen, meaning 'coiled one', referred to a mythological snake-god and to a board game.

Snake god
The earliest references to Mehen occur in the Coffin Texts. Mehen is a protective deity who is depicted as a snake which coils around the sun god Ra during his journey through the night, for instance in the Amduat. 

In the German-Egyptian dictionary by R. Hannig, it is said that the Mehen (mḥn) or the Mehenet (mḥnt) snake is equivalent to the Ouroboros.

Relationship between snake-god and Mehen game

The precise relationship between the deity and the Mehen game is unknown. For instance it is not known whether the game derives from the mythological character, or the character derives from the game.

It is known that the object known as mehen depicts a game rather than a religious fetish as studies of paintings in tombs and game boards and equipment demonstrate this. The rules and method of playing the game are unknown, although rules have been created in modern times based on assessments of how it may have been played.

References

External links

 Educational pdf printable Mehen boardgame with suggesteds playing rules, Birmingham Museums and Art Gallery schools liaison 

Egyptian gods
Legendary serpents
Snake gods